Takali is a village in the Karmala taluka of Solapur district in Maharashtra state, India.

Demographics
Covering  and comprising 500 households at the time of the 2011 census of India, Takali had a population of 2307. There were 1171 males and 1136 females, with 298 people being aged six or younger.

References

Villages in Karmala taluka